HDS may refer to:

Businesses 
 Hitachi Data Systems, an American software company
 Hachette Distribution Services, a Canadian distributor

Technology 
 HTTP Dynamic Streaming
 Hardware-dependent software
 Hydrodesulfurization
 Hydrodynamic separator

Other uses 
 Croatian Composers' Society
 Croatian Democratic Party
 Eastgate Airport, near Hoedspruit, South Africa
 Harvard Divinity School
 Heroes del Silencio, a Spanish rock band 
 Honduran Sign Language